Eoluvarus bondei is a species of extinct bony fish once identified as being a luvar from the Fuller's Earth Ypresian formation of the Barmer District of Rajasthan, India.  Later, better quality specimens were found, and E. bondei was reappraised as being a relative of the prehistoric spadefish, Exellia.

References

Exelliids
Eocene fish of Asia
Extinct animals of India